Nedeljko Gvozdenović (24 February 1902 – 31 January 1988) was a Serbian painter of world renown. He is considered to be the greatest representative of the Belgrade School of Painting.

See also
 List of Serbian painters

External links
Lengthy biography of Gvozdenovic

1902 births
1988 deaths
20th-century Serbian painters
Serbian male painters
20th-century Serbian male artists